Charles Bozon Jr. (15 December 1932 – 7 July 1964) was an alpine ski racer and world champion from France.

Born in Chamonix, Haute-Savoie, Bozon won a gold medal in the slalom at the 1962 World Championships, held at his hometown of Chamonix in a snowstorm. Earlier, he had won a bronze medal in the slalom at the 1960 Winter Olympics in Squaw Valley, California, and two world championship silver medals in the combined in 1956 and 1960.
Bozon suffered fractured vertebra in the giant slalom at the world championships in 1958 and vowed not to compete again. He did not compete in the Olympics in 1964.

Bozon died in 1964 at age 31 in a mountain climbing accident near Mont Blanc. He and 13 climbing companions were killed in an avalanche on the Aiguille Verte, a   mountain in the Mont Blanc massif. The climbing party had reached an elevation of about  when the avalanche occurred. Bozon's father, Charles, Sr., had died on the same slope in an avalanche in 1938.

Less than three months earlier, an avalanche in Switzerland claimed the lives of two noted alpine racers, Buddy Werner of the U.S. and Barbi Henneberger of West Germany.

References

External links
 
 
 

1932 births
1964 deaths
French male alpine skiers
Olympic alpine skiers of France
Olympic bronze medalists for France
Olympic medalists in alpine skiing
Medalists at the 1960 Winter Olympics
Alpine skiers at the 1960 Winter Olympics
Alpine skiers at the 1956 Winter Olympics
People from Chamonix
Deaths in avalanches
Natural disaster deaths in France
Sportspeople from Haute-Savoie
20th-century French people